Alexandre St-Jean (born 10 May 1993) is a Canadian speed skater who is specialized in the sprint distances.

Career 
St-Jean started his speed skating career as a short tracker. He switched from short track to long track speed skating in 2013. He won his first-ever World Cup medal, a gold medal in the team sprint event, at the World Cup in Salt Lake City in November 2015. In December he won a silver medal when he finished second in the World Cup 500m event in Inzell. St-Jean is coached by Gregor Jelonek.

2018 Winter Olympics
St-Jean qualified to compete for Canada at the 2018 Winter Olympics.

Personal records

Source: SpeedskatingResults.com

References

External links
 

1993 births
Living people
Canadian male speed skaters
Speed skaters from Quebec City
Speed skaters at the 2018 Winter Olympics
Olympic speed skaters of Canada
Université Laval alumni
21st-century Canadian people